A complex Hadamard matrix is any complex
 matrix   satisfying two conditions:

unimodularity (the modulus of each entry is unity): 
orthogonality: ,

The concept is a generalization of the Hadamard matrix.

Complex Hadamard matrices arise in the study  of operator algebras and the theory of quantum computation.   Real Hadamard matrices and Butson-type Hadamard matrices form particular cases of complex Hadamard matrices.

Complex Hadamard matrices exist for any natural  (compare the real case, in which existence is not known for every ). For instance the Fourier matrices (the complex conjugate of the DFT matrices without the normalizing factor),

belong to this class.

Equivalency
Two complex Hadamard matrices are called equivalent, written , if there exist diagonal unitary matrices  and permutation matrices  
such that

Any complex Hadamard matrix is equivalent to a dephased Hadamard matrix, in which all elements  in the first row and first column are equal to unity.

For  and  all complex Hadamard matrices are equivalent to the Fourier matrix . For  there exists
a continuous, one-parameter family of inequivalent complex Hadamard matrices,

For  the following families of complex Hadamard matrices
are known:

 a single two-parameter family which includes , 
 a single one-parameter family ,
 a one-parameter orbit , including the circulant Hadamard matrix , 
 a two-parameter orbit including the previous two examples ,
 a one-parameter orbit  of symmetric matrices,
 a two-parameter orbit including the previous example ,
 a three-parameter orbit including all the previous examples ,
 a single point - one  of the Butson-type Hadamard matrices, .

It is not known, however, if this list is complete, but it is conjectured that  is an exhaustive (but not necessarily irredundant) list of all complex Hadamard matrices of order 6.

References 
U. Haagerup, Orthogonal maximal abelian *-subalgebras of the n×n matrices and cyclic n-roots, Operator Algebras and Quantum Field Theory (Rome), 1996 (Cambridge, MA: International Press) pp 296–322. 
P. Dita, Some results on the parametrization of complex Hadamard matrices, J. Phys. A: Math. Gen. 37, 5355-5374 (2004).
F. Szollosi, A two-parametric family of complex Hadamard matrices of order 6 induced by hypocycloids, preprint, arXiv:0811.3930v2 [math.OA]
W. Tadej and K. Życzkowski, A concise guide to complex Hadamard matrices Open Systems & Infor. Dyn. 13 133-177 (2006)

External links 
For an explicit list of known  complex Hadamard matrices and several examples of Hadamard matrices of size 7-16 see Catalogue of Complex Hadamard Matrices

Matrices